William Knibb Memorial High School is a high school in Trelawny Parish, Jamaica. It is named after William Knibb, a 19th-century English missionary.

Notable alumni
Marvin Anderson, sprinter
Usain Bolt, widely considered to be the greatest sprinter of all time
Lerone Clarke, sprinter
Michael Green, sprinter

References

High schools in Jamaica